Psychidocossus is a monotypic moth genus in the family Cossidae described by David Stephen Fletcher in 1982. Its one species, Psychidocossus infantilis, described by William Schaus in 1911, is found in Costa Rica.

References

Cossinae
Monotypic moth genera